The following is a list of cast members who portrayed or voiced characters appearing in the Spider-Man films produced primarily by Columbia Pictures and later co-produced by Marvel Studios and Sony Pictures Animation.  The list is sorted by film and character, as some characters may have been portrayed by multiple actors.

Nicholas Hammond is the first live-action portrayal of the character, starring in The Amazing Spider-Man television series and its made-for-television films Spider-Man (1977),  Spider-Man Strikes Back (1978), and Spider-Man: The Dragon's Challenge (1981).

Tobey Maguire portrayed Peter Parker / Spider-Man in a trilogy of films produced by Columbia Pictures consisting of Spider-Man (2002), Spider-Man 2 (2004), and Spider-Man 3 (2007). A new iteration of the character was portrayed by Andrew Garfield in The Amazing Spider-Man (2012) and The Amazing Spider-Man 2 (2014).

Tom Holland portrays another iteration of the character set in the Marvel Cinematic Universe (MCU), headlining a trilogy co-produced by Columbia Pictures and Marvel Studios consisting of Spider-Man: Homecoming (2017), Spider-Man: Far From Home (2019), and Spider-Man: No Way Home (2021), where he is joined by Maguire and Garfield in supporting roles.  Holland also appeared as the character in the MCU films Captain America: Civil War (2016), Avengers: Infinity War (2018), and Avengers: Endgame (2019), and had an uncredited cameo appearance in the Sony's Spider-Man Universe film Venom: Let There Be Carnage (2021).

Shameik Moore stars in the Sony Pictures Animation film Spider-Man: Into the Spider-Verse (2018) voicing Miles Morales / Spider-Man, with Hailee Steinfeld, Jake Johnson, and Oscar Isaac also featured as Gwen Stacy / Spider-Woman, Peter B. Parker / Spider-Man, and Miguel O'Hara / Spider-Man 2099, respectively. All four actors reprise their roles in the sequels Spider-Man: Across the Spider-Verse (2023) and Spider-Man: Beyond the Spider-Verse (2024).

Several other cast members who recur in the film series and/or within the franchise include Willem Dafoe, Kirsten Dunst, James Franco, Rosemary Harris, Cliff Robertson, J. K. Simmons, Alfred Molina, Thomas Haden Church, Emma Stone, Rhys Ifans, Sally Field, Jamie Foxx, Jon Favreau, Zendaya, Jacob Batalon, Tony Revolori, and Marisa Tomei.

Early films

Sam Raimi's Spider-Man trilogy (2002–2007)

Marc Webb's The Amazing Spider-Man films (2012–2014)

(2016–present)

(2018–present)

Animated Spider-Verse film series (2018–present)

References

External links 

 Early films
 Full cast and crew for Spider-Man (1977) at IMDb
 Full cast and crew for Spider-Man Strikes Back at IMDb
 Full cast and crew for Spider-Man: The Dragon's Challenge at IMDb

 Sam Raimi's Spider-Man trilogy
 Full cast and crew for Spider-Man (2002) at IMDb
 Full cast and crew for Spider-Man 2 at IMDb
 Full cast and crew for Spider-Man 3 at IMDb

 Marc Webb's The Amazing Spider-Man films
 Full cast and crew for The Amazing Spider-Man at IMDb
 Full cast and crew for The Amazing Spider-Man 2 at IMDb

 Marvel Cinematic Universe
 Full cast and crew for Spider-Man: Homecoming at IMDb
 Full cast and crew for Spider-Man: Far From Home at IMDb
 Full cast and crew for Spider-Man: No Way Home at IMDb

 Spider-Verse
 Full cast and crew for Spider-Man: Into the Spider-Verse at IMDb
 Full cast and crew for Spider-Ham: Caught in a Ham at IMDb
 Full cast and crew for Spider-Man: Across the Spider-Verse at IMDb
 Full cast and crew for Spider-Man: Beyond the Spider-Verse at IMDb

Spider-Man in film
Lists of actors by film series
film cast